High Season is a 1987 British romantic comedy film directed by Clare Peploe. It is a comedy about tourism, set on the Greek island of Rhodes; vacationers from rich countries taking over the most spectacular scenery at the most desirable times of the year. There are nine principal characters, a mixture of English, Greek, and a Greek-American. It was written by director Clare Peploe with her brother Mark.

Plot
Katherine (Jacqueline Bisset) is an English photographer who, with her husband Patrick (James Fox), came to live at a coastal town on Rhodes before the tourists discovered it. Their thirteen-year-old daughter Chloe (Ruby Baker) grew up there, and even though Kath and Patrick have separated, they have both stayed on. He supports himself through his sculpture pieces, which Kath despises, and she, by her photography books featuring antiquities and peasant life, which he finds fuddy-duddy.

Kath needs money; her latest book isn't selling. She will be forced to give up her house and leave the island she loves unless she can find a buyer for a vase that was given to her many years earlier by a famous, now elderly art historian, Basil Sharp (Sebastian Shaw), who arrives for a visit. Katherine's  widowed friend Penelope (Irene Papas) regards the tourists as enemies, an army of occupation, and battles with her son Yanni, who appreciates the prosperity the tourists bring.

Rick (Kenneth Branagh), a practical-minded Englishman, fixes Kath's toilet, and becomes smitten by Kath after she rewards him with a passionate kiss. His wife Carol (Lesley Manville) occupies herself with Byron's poetry and the tourist-loving Yanni. The group is completed by Konstantinis (Robert Stephens), a wealthy Greek-American who wants to buy Kath's vase, but needs it to be declared a fake so that he can take it out of Greece.

Cast
 Jacqueline Bisset as Katherine
 James Fox as Patrick
 Kenneth Branagh as Rick
 Lesley Manville as Carol
 Sebastian Shaw as Basil
 Robert Stephens as Konstantinis
 Irene Papas as Penelope
 Ruby Baker as Chloe
 Paris Tselios as Yanni

Production
High Season was director Peploe's first major feature film. She had previously made the half-hour short Couples and Robbers.  Married to Italian director Bernardo Bertolucci, she was one of the screenwriters on Michelangelo Antonioni's Zabriskie Point. She was credited as a writer and an assistant director on Bertolucci's La luna. Her brother Mark, with whom she collaborated on the script, previously wrote The Passenger for Antonioni, and the screenplay for The Last Emperor with Bertolucci.

References

External links
 
 

1987 films
1987 romantic comedy films
Films about photographers
Films set in Greece
Films set on islands
Films set in the Mediterranean Sea
1987 directorial debut films
British romantic comedy films
1980s British films